Mazhar Raslan (1886 – 28 May 1948) figure who served as the 2nd Prime Minister of Jordan in 1921–1922.

See also
 Politics of Jordan

References

1886 births
1948 deaths
Prime Ministers of Jordan
Government ministers of Jordan
People from Aleppo